Azulene is an organic compound and an isomer of naphthalene. Naphthalene is colourless, whereas azulene is dark blue. Two terpenoids, vetivazulene (4,8-dimethyl-2-isopropylazulene) and guaiazulene (1,4-dimethyl-7-isopropylazulene), that feature the azulene skeleton are found in nature as constituents of pigments in mushrooms, guaiac wood oil, and some marine invertebrates.

Azulene has a long history, dating back to the 15th century as the azure-blue chromophore obtained by steam distillation of German chamomile. The chromophore was discovered in yarrow and wormwood and named in 1863 by Septimus Piesse. Its structure was first reported by Lavoslav Ružička, followed by its organic synthesis in 1937 by Placidus Plattner.

Structure and bonding

Azulene is usually viewed as resulting from fusion of cyclopentadiene and cycloheptatriene rings. Like naphthalene and cyclodecapentaene, it is a 10 pi electron system. It exhibits aromatic properties: (i) the peripheral bonds have similar lengths and (ii) it undergoes Friedel-Crafts-like substitutions. The stability gain from aromaticity is estimated to be half that of naphthalene.

This polarity can be explained by regarding azulene as the fusion of a 6 π-electron cyclopentadienyl anion and a 6 π-electron tropylium cation: one electron from the seven-membered ring is transferred to the five-membered ring to give each ring aromatic stability by Hückel's rule. Reactivity studies confirm that seven-membered ring is electrophilic and the five-membered ring is nucleophilic.

The dipolar nature of the ground state is reflected in its deep colour, which is unusual for small unsaturated aromatic compounds. Another notable feature of azulene is that it violates Kasha's rule by exhibiting fluorescence from an upper-excited state (S2 → S0).

Organic synthesis
Synthetic routes to azulene have long been of interest because of its unusual structure. In 1939 the first method was reported by St. Pfau and Plattner  starting from indane and ethyl diazoacetate.

An efficient one-pot route entails annulation of cyclopentadiene with unsaturated C5-synthons. The alternative approach from cycloheptatriene has long been known, one illustrative method being shown below.

Procedure:
 cycloheptatriene 2+2 cycloaddition with dichloro ketene
 diazomethane insertion reaction
 dehydrohalogenation reaction with DMF
 Luche reduction to alcohol with sodium borohydride
 elimination reaction with Burgess reagent
 oxidation with p-chloranil
 dehalogenation with polymethylhydrosiloxane, palladium(II) acetate, potassium phosphate and the DPDB ligand

Organometallic complexes
In organometallic chemistry, azulene serves as a ligand for low-valent metal centers, which otherwise are known to form π-complexes with both cyclopentadienyl and cycloheptatrienyl ligands. Illustrative complexes are (azulene)Mo2(CO)6 and (azulene)Fe2(CO)5.

Derivatives

1-Hydroxyazulene is an unstable green oil and it does not show keto–enol tautomerism.  2-Hydroxyazulene is obtained by hydrolysis of 2-methoxyazulene with hydrobromic acid. It is stable and does show keto–enol tautomerism. The pKa of 2-hydroxyazulene in water is 8.71. It is more acidic than phenol or naphthol.  The pKa of 6-hydroxyazulenes in water is 7.38 making it also more acidic than phenol or naphthol.

In naphth[a]azulene, a naphthalene ring is condensed at the 1,2-positions of azulene. In one such system deviation from planarity is found, similar to that of tetrahelicene.

Guaiazulene (1,4-dimethyl-7-isopropylazulene) is an alkylated derivative of azulene with an almost identical intensely blue colour. It is commercially available to the cosmetics industry where it functions as a skin conditioning agent.

References

External links 
 MSDS Website
 MSDS Website

Cosmetics chemicals
Azulenes
Polycyclic aromatic hydrocarbons